Zippererstraße  is a station on  of the Vienna U-Bahn. It is located in the Simmering District. It opened in 2000.

References

External links 
 

Buildings and structures in Simmering (Vienna)
Railway stations opened in 2000
2000 establishments in Austria
Vienna U-Bahn stations
Railway stations in Austria opened in the 21st century